"", Op. 461, German: "" (Arbor waltz) is the title of a waltz by the Austrian composer Johann Strauss II. The waltz was dedicated to readers of the magazine Die Gartenlaube, a German weekly for the middle class, which became the most-read magazine in 1890s Germany.

It was first performed in the Golden Hall of the Vienna Musikverein on 6 January 1895, conducted by the composer and in the presence of the composers Carl Goldmark, Johannes Brahms and Richard Heuberger. It was so successful that the enthusiastic applause demanded an immediate encore. It was played again a week later in a concert by Eduard Strauss who introduced it to London audiences in his concerts at the Imperial Institute in Kensington, starting on 11 May 1896. In a Royal Command Performance for Queen Victoria on 30 May 1895 in Buckingham Palace, it was played under the title "Garden-Bower Waltz".

Composition notes
Then begins the first principal waltz melody, marked Tempo di Valse (typical waltz tempo), in simple waltz time, . A performance takes about twelve minutes.

The "Gartenlaube Waltz" is scored for orchestra. However, Johann Strauss also wrote a piano version of the waltz.

Notes

References
 Lloyd, Norman, The Golden Encyclopedia of Music, New York: Golden Press, a division of Western Publishing, Inc., 1968.

External links

 , including extensive notes

1895 compositions
Waltzes by Johann Strauss II
Compositions set in Austria
Compositions in E-flat major